To Russia with Love is a documentary film by Canadian director Noam Gonick, released in 2014. Shot in Sochi, Russia during the 2014 Winter Olympics, the film centres on the controversial Russian gay propaganda law, and the ethical dilemmas faced by openly LGBT athletes such as Johnny Weir, Belle Brockhoff, Anastasia Bucsis and Blake Skjellerup around whether to speak out against the law while competing in Russia.

The film was narrated by Jane Lynch, and also included interviews with Billie Jean King, Greg Louganis, Simona Meiler, Charline Labonté, Brian Burke, Mark Tewksbury, David Remnick, Stephen Fry and Jason Collins.

The film premiered on the Epix cable network in the United States in August 2014. It had its Canadian premiere at the Inside Out Film and Video Festival in 2015, and received selected other theatrical screenings before being broadcast by CBC Television.

The film received a GLAAD Media Award nomination for Outstanding Documentary at the 26th GLAAD Media Awards.

References

External links 
 

2014 films
American documentary television films
American LGBT-related television films
Canadian documentary television films
Canadian LGBT-related television episodes
Films directed by Noam Gonick
2014 LGBT-related films
Documentary films about LGBT sportspeople
Canadian sports documentary films
American sports documentary films
2010s English-language films
2010s Canadian films
2010s American films